Manny Puig  (born January 25, 1955) is a Cuban-born wildlife entertainer who is known for his direct approach when dealing with dangerous animals such as sharks, black bears and American alligators. He has made frequent appearances on the television shows Jackass and Wildboyz and also on the Animal Planet show Gator Boys. He is also known for hosting Outdoor Channel's "Savage Wild". Puig has appeared in numerous documentaries as an animal expert and even appeared on Late Night with Conan O'Brien and on Shark Week.

Early life

Manny Puig was born in Cuba and immigrated to Florida with his mother, where he became interested in wildlife. Living so close to the Florida Keys only increased his interest in animals. In his youth, Puig traveled into the Everglades with only a frying pan and a shotgun. He learned to hunt deer at an early age and started hand-catching small American alligators underwater in his teens.

Career

In the late 1990s, Puig worked with Mehgan Heaney-Grier and Mark Rackley, both in training Grier as a free diver and in filming underwater encounters with animals such as alligators and sharks. Rackley worked as a spearfisherman and underwater videographer. Puig had experience as an animal handler on movie sets and had learned how to ride and handle alligators in their environment. The trio formed a company named Extreme Encounters, and the footage they produced led to the Animal Planet series titled Extreme Contact. The 20 episode series featured the trio in cage-free encounters with sharks, alligators and other aquatic wildlife.

Puig advocates a basic approach to wildlife and denounces the use of safety gear such as cages, protective clothing and diving apparatus. He states that he has a great respect for the Native Americans because of their interaction with the land and their survival skills. His interests also include history, art and geography documentaries. He spends his free time working on sculpting, hand-crafting medieval weapons and hunting tools.

Puig has appeared on the television program Jackass, in Jackass: The Movie, Jackass Number Two, Jackass 2.5, Jackass 3D, and Jackass 3.5. In these projects, he is credited as an expert on predatory animals. One of Puig's stunts is featured in the second film, where he dives with Steve-O around hammerhead and other dangerous sharks. Steve-O recalled the segment in his autobiography, stating: "The following day, Chris Pontius and I were scheduled to swim with great hammerhead sharks, accompanied by Manny....with the butt piercing wound still fresh, swimming with sharks might not have been very smart, but Manny wasn't worried about it....In retrospect, the fact that Manny was the arbiter of what was safe and reasonable is hilarious. He hatched and okayed plenty of ideas that were clearly not okay. So you knew if he said no to something, that meant "FUCK NO!" As it happened, Manny had no problem sending us swimming with great hammerheads."

Puig is also featured on the MTV program Wildboyz, where he resumes the role of a predatory-animal expert. Some of Puig's stunts on Wildboyz include having a snapping turtle lock onto his hand. According to Chris Pontius on the special features of one of the Wildboyz DVDs, he heard Puig scream for the first time in his life when he had the snapping turtle bite his hand in the Deep South, United States.

After finishing the second Jackass movie and with the final season of Wildboyz having completed, Puig produced his own film entitled Ultimate Predator. The film shows him interacting particularly with sharks. The film also features adventures with Johnny Knoxville, Steve-O, Chris Pontius. and Jeff Tremaine. Towards the end of filming Manny left the set due to a confrontation with fellow wildlife expert David Weathers, Manny was quoted as telling him to “treat animals with the respect they deserve”, they eventually settled the dispute.

During Discovery Channel's Shark Week in 2003 Puig was profiled for an episode entitled "Diary of a Shark Man".

Puig also appeared on "Feeding Time" during Discovery Channel's Shark Week in 2007.

Puig was featured on the Outdoor Channel show called Savage Wild.  The episodes of Savage Wild take place in the Everglades and surrounding environs near Miami, Florida and range from Puig hunting a wild boar with only a rudimentary spear, or carefully maneuvering through the water with a monster alligator, or handling highly venomous wild snakes, such as water moccasins, in their natural environment.

Puig's left middle finger was amputated after a rattlesnake bite.

Filmography

Films

Television

References

External links
 
 

American people of Cuban descent
American television personalities
Living people
American people of Catalan descent
Hispanic and Latino American entertainers
1955 births
Jackass (TV series)